The 2002 Qatar Open, known as the 2002 Qatar ExxonMobil Open, for sponsorship reasons,  was a men's tennis tournament played on outdoor hard courts at the Khalifa International Tennis Complex in Doha, Qatar and was part of the International Series of the 2002 ATP Tour. The tournament ran from 31 December 2001 through 5 January 2002. Sixth-seeded Younes El Aynaoui won the singles title.

Finals

Singles

 Younes El Aynaoui defeated  Félix Mantilla 4–6, 6–2, 6–2

Doubles

 Donald Johnson /  Jared Palmer defeated  Jiří Novák /  David Rikl 6–3, 7–6(7–5)

References

External links
 Official website
 ATP tournament profile

 
Qatar Open
2002 in Qatari sport
Qatar Open (tennis)